Dədəli (also, Dadaly and Dedeli) is a village in the Fuzuli District of Azerbaijan. The village was occupied by Armenian forces during the First Nagorno-Karabakh War, but was recaptured by Azerbaijan on 17 October 2020.

References 

Populated places in Fuzuli District